Not Quite Human is a 1987 American comedy television film directed by Steven Hilliard Stern and starring Jay Underwood, Alan Thicke, and Robyn Lively.  The story is based on the Not Quite Human book series by Seth McEvoy. It is the first of three films in a series; its sequels are Not Quite Human II (1989) and Still Not Quite Human (1992). The filming locations were in Scottsdale and Phoenix, Arizona.

Plot
Dr. Jonas Carson (Alan Thicke) creates an android that looks just like a human teenage boy, and he "adopts" him as his son and as an older brother to Becky (Robyn Lively), who names him Chip. After the Carsons move to a new town, Chip (Jay Underwood) is enrolled in high school alongside Becky. Dr. Carson also goes to the high school, having filled a vacancy as a science teacher, which allows him close range to see how Chip interacts with others.

Chip's ways seem to have an annoying or amusing effect on students and teachers, depending on how it is viewed. Chip runs afoul of Coach Duckworth and strict teachers, but his literalist actions surprisingly make him some friends, as other teenagers see it as a way that he is bucking the system. Chip also gains the attention of Erin (Kristy Swanson), a fellow student.

However, Dr. Carson and Chip are being stalked by Gordon Vogel (Joseph Bologna), a former employer who is a defense contractor. A former colleague of Carson's, J.J. Derks, is enlisted to seek out Carson. When asked about Carson's son, Derks says Carson only has a daughter until he remembers that Carson in his younger years had confided in some friends about his idea to make a realistic android, which Derks and the others originally dismissed. Vogel tells Derks they will capture Chip, as Carson had failed to oblige an earlier contract. Since Chip was built with Vogel's resources and while Carson was supposed to honor the contract, Vogel claims he is entitled to ownership of Chip. When Derks questions what Vogel wants with Chip, Vogel replies he intends to reprogram Chip for military purposes. Chip must shake his pursuers while trying to present a "normal" life like a human.

Cast
 Jay Underwood as Chip Carson
 Alan Thicke as Dr. Jonas Carson
 Robyn Lively as Becky Carson
 Joseph Bologna as Gordon Vogel
 Robert Harper as J.J. Derks
 Kristy Swanson as Erin Jeffries
 Lili Haydn as Jenny Beckerman
 Brandon Douglas as Scott Barnes
 Carey Scott as Paul Fairgate
 Brian Cole as Jake Blocker
 Sasha Mitchell as Bryan Skelly
 Judy Starr as Dr. Sondra Stahl
 Greg Monaghan as Coach Duckworth

Production
Not Quite Human was made as a two part movie by Disney for the Disney Channel.

Reception
The film received two out of 5 stars by Creature Feature, which called it "undistinguished fodder". Entertainment Weekly gave the film a "C", calling it mild.

References

External links
 

1980s English-language films
1987 television films
1987 films
American science fiction television films
Android (robot) films
1980s science fiction films
Disney television films
Films directed by Steven Hilliard Stern
Films scored by Tom Scott
Films shot in Arizona
1980s American films